Achmad Dimyati (born 3 December 1938) is an Indonesian former swimmer. He competed in the men's 100 metre freestyle at the 1960 Summer Olympics.

References

External links
 

1938 births
Living people
Indonesian male freestyle swimmers
Olympic swimmers of Indonesia
Swimmers at the 1960 Summer Olympics
Sportspeople from Jakarta
Asian Games medalists in swimming
Asian Games bronze medalists for Indonesia
Swimmers at the 1962 Asian Games
Medalists at the 1962 Asian Games
20th-century Indonesian people
21st-century Indonesian people